Joseph Mithika Mwenda  commonly known as Mithika Mwenda or simply Mzalendo (Swahili for "patriot" or "nationalist"), is the Kenyan-born co-founder of an African climate change activism organisation Pan African Climate Justice Alliance (PACJA), and has been a climate advocate for over 10 years.

Early life and education 
Mithika Mwenda was born in 1973 in Meru County, Kenya. His father, Mzee Mwenda, belongs from the Meru tribe and hails from Meru County. Mithika studied at Moi University where he was a student leader, before joining Jomo Kenyatta University of Agriculture and Technology for postgraduate studies in public policy analysis. Mwenda, a Ph.D student at Wits School of Governance, represents the African civil society in the committee of the World Bank Forest Carbon Partnership Facility, and also chairs the Collaboration Platform of Climate Research for Development in Africa. He was named among 100 most influential people in climate change policy in the world.

Pan African Climate Justice Alliance 
Mithika Mwenda has been executive director for Pan African Climate Justice Alliance for more than 10 years. He has extensive experience as a climate change policy advocate and was named most influential people in Climate Change Policy 2019. Previously he worked as a climate change officer with the All Africa Conference Churches and Climate Network Africa. Before this, he worked and volunteered in numerous governance and human rights, as well as democracy organisations in Kenya. He was a co-convener of the National Convention Executive Council in the 2000s, which influenced the 2010 draft of the Constitution of Kenya.

Notable events 
Mithika Mwenda was feted for climate policy activism, for his contribution to climate policy discourse. Mithika represents civil society in the steering committee of Africa's flagship climate policy and practice coordination platform, ClimDev-Africa, spearheaded by the African Union Commission, African Development Bank and UN Economic Commission for Africa (UNECA). He chairs Institutional Collaboration Platform Climate Research for Development in Africa, run by World Meteorological Organisation, Global Framework for Climate Services, African Union and UNECA. Mithika has advocated for accelerated implementation of the Paris Agreement, and has made that a focus at PACJA. He also helped establish the African Coalition for Sustainable Energy and Access (ACSEA), to promote the shift to renewable energy, and to ensure the African Renewable Energy Initiative delivers clean energy to poor communities. Under the African Climate Legislation Initiative, PACJA works with Pan African Parliament and other parliamentary institutions to drive climate laws to make climate change prevention part of national development policy.

Awards
Mithika Mwenda's efforts as a climate change activist have been recognised for influencing climate change policies in Kenya and other African countries. As PACJA executive director, Mithika Mwenda was selected for the Sierra Club's Earth Care Award 2019  for his contribution to international environmental protection and conservation.

References

External links
 
 
 
 
 
 
 
 
 
 Trans-African climate caravan hits Nairobi | Pambazuka News
 
 
 
 
 Kenya praised for taking threats of climate change seriously | ClimDev-Africa
 
 Transparency International - Event - Climate Finance Integrity Talk: Johannesburg/ Ensuring Climate Finance Effectiveness in Africa
 Campaigners urge African policy shift to boost uptake of clean energy - Xinhua | English.news.cn
 
 
 
 
 
 
 
 
 

Meru people
1975 births
Meru County
Living people
Climate activists
Kenyan environmentalists
Moi University alumni
Jomo Kenyatta University of Agriculture and Technology alumni